Th-fronting is the pronunciation of the English "th" as "f" or "v". When th-fronting is applied,  becomes  (for example, three is pronounced as free) and  becomes  (for example, bathe is pronounced as bave). (Here "fronting" refers to the position in the mouth where the sound is produced, not the position of the sound in the word, with the "th" coming from the tongue as opposed to the "f" or "v" coming from the more-forward lower lip.) Th-fronting is a prominent feature of several dialects of English, notably Cockney, Essex dialect, Estuary English, some West Country and Yorkshire dialects, African American Vernacular English, and Liberian English, as well as in many non-native English speakers (e.g. Hong Kong English, though the details differ among those accents).

Uses

The first reference to th-fronting is in the "low English" of London in 1787, though only a single author in that century writes about it, and it was likely perceived as an idiosyncrasy, rather than a full-fledged dialect feature of Cockney English, even into the early half of the twentieth century. The feature was presumed to be reasonably common in London speakers born around 1850 and in Bristol by 1880. In his 1892 book A Grammar of the Dialect of Windhill, Joseph Wright noted variable th-fronting in his district in words such as think, third and smithy.

In some words, th-fronting has been lexicalised.  For example, the word without was lexicalised to wivoot in some dialects of Northern England and Scotland.

In the Survey of English Dialects of the 1950s and early 1960s, th-fronting was found in two main areas of England.  One was the area around Bristol in the West Country.  The other was in the area around London and Essex.  It was also noted in the Suffolk dialect by AOD Claxton in 1968, albeit only for certain words (e.g. three and thumb but not thaw or thought).

Comparing his studies over time in Norwich, Peter Trudgill concluded that th-fronting had been completely absent in 1968 and then very common amongst younger people by 1983. Although th-fronting is found occasionally in the middle and upper (middle) class English accents as well, there is still a marked social difference between working and middle class speakers. Th-fronting is regarded as a 'boundary marker' between Cockney and Estuary English, as depicted in the first descriptions of the latter form of English and confirmed by a phonetic study conducted by researcher Ulrike Altendorf. Nevertheless, Altendorf points out that th-fronting is found occasionally in middle class (Estuary) speech as well and concludes that "it is currently making its way into the middle class English accent and thus into Estuary English".

In popular music, the singer Joe Brown's 1960s backing band was christened The Bruvvers (that is, "the brothers" with th-fronting). The 1960 musical Fings Ain't Wot They Used T'Be was stated to be a Cockney Comedy. Rock musician  Keith Richards is commonly referred to as “Keef”.

Up until the late 20th century th-fronting was common in speakers of Australian English from North Brisbane and the Sunshine Coast of Queensland.  This may stem from the relatively high number of London cockneys who settled there during the Queensland gold rushes of the 19th century.  The practice is gradually dying out as the influx of interstate and international immigrants increases.

Example
The following is a sample of a speaker of the Cockney accent who has th-fronting:
 http://www.gazzaro.it/accents/sound/Cockney.mp3

My dad came from Wapping and me mum came from Poplar. Me dad was one of eleven kids… and Wapping in them days really was one of the poorest parts of London. I mean they really didn't have shoes on their feet. I'm talking about seventy years ago now. Erm… and Poplar was… sli… just slightly a cut above Wapping; erm… you was either East End respectable or you was sort of East End villain, you know, and my family was respectable on both sides. But me father had a very tough time because his father died when he was nineteen, leaving him the only one working to bring up eleven brothers… ten brothers and sisters and on a Thursday night he'd sometimes go home and the youngest two would be crying in the corner and he'd say “What's the matter with them, ma?” “Oh, well, Harry, you know it's Thursday night, and you don't get paid till tomorrow.” and they literally didn't have any food in the house.

Pronouns (they, them, their) and the are not affected.

Increase in use
Th-fronting in the speech of working-class adolescents in Glasgow was reported in 1998, provoking public as well as academic interest.  The finding of th-fronting in Glaswegian creates a difficulty for models of language change which hinge on dialect contact associated with geographical mobility since the Glaswegian speakers who used  most in the 1997 sample are also those with the lowest geographical mobility.  In addition, th-fronting was reported as "a relatively new phenomenon" in Edinburgh in March 2013.

Homophonous pairs

See also
 List of th-fronting homophones
 Th-stopping

References

English phonology
Splits and mergers in English phonology
English th